Puzur-Inshushinak (Linear Elamite:  Puzur Šušinak, Akkadian: , puzur3-dinšušinak, also , puzur4-dinšušinak "Calling Inshushinak"), also sometimes thought to read Kutik-Inshushinak in Elamite, was king of Elam, around 2100 BC, and the last from the Awan dynasty according to the Susa kinglist. He mentions his father's name as Šimpi-išhuk, which, being an Elamite name, suggests that Puzur-Inshuhinak himself was Elamite.

In the inscription of the "Table au Lion", he appears as "Puzur-Inshushin(ak) Ensi (Governor) of Susa, Shakkanakku (Military Governor) of the country of Elam" (a title used by his predecessors Eshpum, Epirmupi and Ili-ishmani as governors of the Akkadian Empire for the territory of Elam. In another inscription, he calls himself the "Mighty King of Elam", suggesting an accession to independence from the weakening Akkadian Empire.

Rule
His father was Shinpi-khish-khuk, the crown prince, and most likely a brother of king Khita. Kutik-Inshushinak's first position was as governor of Susa, which he may have held from a young age. About 2110 BC, his father died, and he became crown prince in his stead.

Elam had been under the domination of Akkad since the time of Sargon, and Kutik-Inshushinak accordingly campaigned in the Zagros mountains on their behalf. He was greatly successful as his conquests seem to have gone beyond the initial mission.

In 2090 BC, he asserted his independence from king Shar-Kali-Sharri of the Akkadian Empire, which had been weakening ever since the death of Naram-Sin, thus making himself king of Elam. He conquered Anshan and managed to unite most of Elam into one kingdom. 

According to the inscriptions of Ur-Nammu, Puzur-Inshushinak conquered numerous cities in central Mesopotamia, including Eshnunna and Akkad, and probably Akshak. His conquests probably encroached considerably on Gutian territory, gravely weakening them, and making them unable to withstand the Neo-Sumerian revolt of Utu-hengal.

He built extensively on the citadel at Susa, and encouraged the use of the Linear Elamite script to write the Elamite language. This may be seen as a reaction against Sargon's attempt to force the use of Akkadian. Most inscriptions in Linear Elamite date from the reign of Kutik-Inshushinak.

His achievements were not long-lasting, for after his death the linear script fell into disuse, and Susa was overrun by the Third dynasty of Ur under Ur-Nammu and his son Shulgi. The Ur III dynasty had held control over Susa after the demise of Puzur-Inshushinak, and they built numerous buildings and temples there. This control was continued by Shulgi as shown by his numerous dedications in the city-state. He also engaged in marital alliances, by marrying his daughters to rulers of eastern territories, such as Anshan, Marhashi and Bashime. Concomitantly, Elam fell under control of the Shimashki dynasty (also Elamite of origin).

It is now known that his reign in Elam overlapped with that of Ur-Nammu of Ur-III, although the previous lengthy estimates of the duration of the intervening Gutian dynasty and rule of Utu-hengal of Uruk had not allowed for that synchronism. Ur-Nammu, who styled himself "King of Sumer and Akkad" is probably the one who, early in his reign, reconquered the northern territories that had been occupied by Puzur-Inshushinak, before going on to conquer Susa.

Statue of Puzur-Inshushinak
The bottom part of a statue, probably representing Puzur-Inshushinak himself, is visible in the Louvre Museum, Sb 55. The statue lists the numerous victories of Puzur-Inshushinak over neighbouring territories, and particularly mentions the submission of the king of Shimashki who "kissed his feet".

Inscriptions
A possible mention of Puzur-Inshushinak appears in one of Puzer-Mama's inscriptions, but this is considered doubtful by Walter Sommerfeld and Piotr Steinkeller.

References

Elamite people
Elamite kings
23rd-century BC rulers
Awan Dynasty